TÜSİAD, the Turkish Industry and Business Association, is Turkey's top business organization.

Founded in 1971, TÜSİAD is a voluntary, independent, non-governmental organization dedicated to promoting public welfare through private enterprise. TÜSİAD promotes principles of participatory democracy, a competitive market economy, environmental sustainability, and universal freedoms and human rights. The Association supports independent research and policy discussions on important social and economic issues in Turkey and abroad. TÜSİAD is composed of CEOs and executives from major industrial and services companies in Turkey, including Fortune 500 companies. The current Chairman is Simone Kaslowski and the Secretary-General (CEO) is Bahadir Kaleagasi.

About 
TÜSİAD represents more than 4,000 member companies which represent half of the Turkey's value-added; 80% of Turkey’s total foreign trade volume; more than 50% of private sector employment; and 80% of corporate tax revenue.

Structure 
TÜSİAD headquarters are in Istanbul and there are seven representative offices: Ankara, Brussels, Washington, D.C., Paris, Berlin, Beijing and London.

TÜSİAD's activities are structured around round tables led by members of the board of directors and 36 working groups.

TÜSİAD partners with the Brookings Institution, the German Marshall Fund of the United States, and St. Petersburg International Economic Forum (SPIEF).

TÜSİAD is a member of the Business and Industry Advisory Committee to the OECD (BIAC), Global Business Coalition, and BusinessEurope.

Political Context 
TÜSİAD is considered Turkey's secular, pro-Westernization business organization (For its pious Muslim counterpart see MÜSİAD). In the early 2000s, TÜSIAD coordinated heavily with the newly elected AKP majority, with the shared aim of joining the European Union. TÜSIAD is also credited with laying the groundwork for Turkish support for the Annan Plan on Cyprus. However, as the EU accession process began to deteriorate in 2006, then-Prime Minister Recep Tayyip Erdoğan's administration reversed course away from the EU, driving a wedge between the two. Since then, TÜSİAD has embarked on a project of public diplomacy, opening representative offices in European capitals and Washington, D.C. to engage and collaborate with relevant actors in the private sector and general public.

In June 2016, TÜSİAD released a statement criticizing a proposed law which would enhance the government’s authority to appoint boards of trustees to companies. The controversial article was later removed from the law.

Turkish President Recep Tayyip Erdoğan has criticized TÜSİAD on multiple occasions. In April 2015, Erdoğan was critical of comments made about the Turkish economy. In December 2014, Erdoğan criticized the organization for apparently side-stepping his office after then TÜSİAD President Haluk Dinçer explained the organization works with the prime minister and ministers whose business is related to the organization’s efforts, not the president.

Though occasionally at odds politically with the ruling AKP, they are a united front on economic matters; immediately following the July 15th 2016 coup attempt TÜSIAD took out ads in major world newspapers and held high level meetings with American and European think tanks, NGOs, and government officials in tandem with Turkish government officials in order to brandish Turkey's image abroad and reassure investors of Turkey's economic and political health.

Presidents
 1971–1979 Feyyaz Berker
 1980–1984 Ali Koçman
 1985 Şahap Kocatopçu
 1986 Sakıp Sabancı
 1987–1988 Ömer Dinçkök
 1989–1990 Cem Boyner
 1991–1992 Bülent Eczacıbaşı
 1993–1996 Halis Komili
 1997–1998 Muharrem Kayhan
 1999–2000 Erkut Yücaoğlu
 2001–2003 Tuncay Özilhan
 2004–2006 Ömer Sabancı
 2007–2009 Arzuhan Doğan Yalçındağ
 2010–2013 Ümit Nazlı Boyner
 2013–2014 
 2014–2015 Haluk Dinçer
 2015–2017 Cansen Başaran–Symes
 2017–2019 Erol Bilecik
 2019–Present Simone Kaslowski

External links 
 http://www.tusiad.org/
 http://www.tusiad.us

References

Business organizations based in Turkey
Conservatism in Turkey
Organizations established in 1971
Organizations based in Istanbul
1971 establishments in Turkey